Ram Lakhan Singh Yadav College established in 1972, is one of the oldest general degree college in Ranchi, Jharkhand state of India. It provides undergraduate education in arts, commerce and sciences. It is affiliated to  Ranchi University.

Departments

See also
Education in India
Ranchi University
Ranchi
Literacy in India
List of institutions of higher education in Jharkhand

References

External links
 http://www.rlsycollege.ac.in/

Colleges affiliated to Ranchi University
Educational institutions established in 1972
Universities and colleges in Ranchi
Universities and colleges in Jharkhand
1972 establishments in Bihar